The St. Pete/Winston-Salem Parrots were an ice hockey team in the Atlantic Coast Hockey League in the 2002–03 season. They began the season in St. Petersburg, Florida and moved to Winston-Salem, North Carolina on November 30, 2002. They folded after the season with a record of 28-23-6.

Season-by-season record

Records
Games: Andrew Dickson, John Gurskis 57
Goals: Matt Holmes 22
Assists: John Gurskis 40
Points: John Gurkis 53
PIM: Ken Fels 187

External links
 The Internet Hockey Database

2002 establishments in Florida
2003 disestablishments in North Carolina
Atlantic Coast Hockey League (2002–03) teams
Defunct ice hockey teams in the United States
Ice hockey clubs disestablished in 2003
Ice hockey teams in Florida
Ice hockey teams in North Carolina
Ice hockey clubs established in 2002
Sports in Winston-Salem, North Carolina
Sports in St. Petersburg, Florida